In mathematics and statistics, the Fréchet mean is a generalization of centroids to metric spaces, giving a single representative point or central tendency for a cluster of points. It is named after Maurice Fréchet. Karcher mean is the renaming of the Riemannian Center of Mass construction developed by Karsten Grove and Hermann Karcher. On the real numbers, the arithmetic mean, median, geometric mean, and harmonic mean can all be interpreted as Fréchet means for different distance functions.

Definition

Let (M, d) be a complete metric space. Let x1, x2, …, xN be points in M. For any point p in M, define the Fréchet variance to be the sum of squared distances from p to the xi:

The Karcher means are then those points, m of M, which locally minimise Ψ:

If there is an m of M that globally minimises Ψ, then it is Fréchet mean.

Sometimes, the xi are assigned weights wi. Then, the Fréchet variance is calculated as a weighted sum,

Examples of Fréchet means

Arithmetic mean and median 

For real numbers, the arithmetic mean is a Fréchet mean, using the usual Euclidean distance as the distance function.

The median is also a Fréchet mean, if the definition of the function Ψ is generalized to the non-quadratic

where , and the Euclidean distance is the distance function d. In higher-dimensional spaces, this becomes the geometric median.

Geometric mean
On the positive real numbers, the (hyperbolic) distance function  can be defined. The geometric mean is the corresponding Fréchet mean.

.

Harmonic mean
On the positive real numbers, the metric (distance function):
 

can be defined. The harmonic mean is the corresponding Fréchet mean.

Power means
Given a non-zero real number , the power mean can be obtained as a Fréchet mean by introducing the metric

f-mean
Given an invertible and continuous function , the f-mean can be defined as the Fréchet mean obtained by using the metric:
 

This is sometimes called the generalised f-mean or quasi-arithmetic mean.

Weighted means
The general definition of the Fréchet mean that includes the possibility of weighting observations can be used to derive weighted versions for all of the above types of means.

See also
Circular mean
Fréchet distance
M-estimator
Geometric median

References

Means